Potatiskorv (more commonly known as värmlandskorv in Sweden) is a regional Swedish sausage from Värmland, made with ground pork, beef, onions, and potatoes. Potatiskorv is traditionally served hot at Christmas in Värmland but often served hot or cold throughout the year. 
"Potatiskorv" is what this sausage is called in parts of Värmland. In most parts of Sweden, the word "potatiskorv" is unknown, while "värmlandskorv" is well known and sold commercially around Christmas throughout the country, for the benefit of people from Värmland. In the United States, "potatiskorv" (usually written "potatis korv") is the name that has stuck among people with Swedish roots.

There is also a local sausage in parts of Småland known as "potatiskorv", mentioned in the Emil children's books by Astrid Lindgren. However, that sausage contains no beef, only potatoes and pork.

See also
List of sausages

References

External links
Potatis korv recipe from Odebolt in Iowa Linked 2012-10-29
Cut-and-paste kitchen blog, June 9, 2008: Potatis Korv - a knowledge lost Linked 2012-10-29
Potatiskorv on the table: Reflections of a Fourth-Generation Swedish-American Linked 2012-10-29

Swedish sausages
Christmas food